The Amilcar C8 is an eight-cylinder car in the 13CV car tax band made between 1929 and 1931 (and still listed in 1932) by the French Amilcar company.    The car was normally sold in “bare chassis” form, giving rise to a wide range of possible body types, but coachwork appear usually to have been for two door sporting bodied cars.
Approximately 350 were made.

Origins 
The C8 was the result of the manufacturer's wish, encouraged by the rising prosperity of the 1920s, to extend the Amilcar range upmarket.   Amilcar had already built its reputation and market share with smaller cars, and the C8 was its first eight-cylinder model.

Bodies 
The usual range of body types could be fitted included sedans/saloons, coupés and cabriolets.   The C8 was a substantial car, intended to compete against models such as the Delage DS and the Panhard & Levassor CS.

Engine 
The C8's straight-8 ohc engine had a capacity of 2330cc which placed it in the 13CV taxation class. The top speed will have depended on the weight and form of the body specified, but was quoted at 120 km/h (75 mph).

Running gear 
Power was delivered to the rear-wheels via a four speed manual gear box.   The suspension used traditional leaf springs all round.

Commercial 
Having been conceived during a period of rising incomes, the C8 arrived in an over-supplied market place in a period of economic panic and stringency.   The engine acquired a reputation for unreliability.   The manufacturer fought to gain market share with ungraded models such as the ”C8 bis” and the “CS8”,  but the car was not a commercial success.   Amilcar abandoned the market segment, delisting the C8 towards the end of 1932.   An indirect replacement appeared in 1934 with the presentation of the  Pégase, which came with the option of a big four cylinder 2490cc (14CV) engine.

External links 
Da Histomobile, pagina dedicata alla serie C8
Dal sito della Amilcar, pagina con scheda tecnica della CS8

References

Amilcar vehicles
Cars introduced in 1929